PlaceWare was a provider of web conferencing software, and was founded in 1996 by Xerox engineers Pavel Curtis, Mike Dixon, and David Nichols as a spin-off from Xerox PARC.  Its first product, PlaceWare Auditorium, was rolled out in March 1997, and used by such companies as Hewlett-Packard, Intel, Sun Microsystems, and PBS.

Placeware was acquired by Microsoft in 2003, and its core product renamed Microsoft Office Live Meeting.

References

External links
 Microsoft's current Live Meeting product page

Defunct software companies of the United States
Companies established in 1996
Companies disestablished in 2003
Microsoft acquisitions
Xerox spin-offs